Isaac Lodge VC (6 May 1866 – 18 June 1923) was an English recipient of the Victoria Cross (VC), the highest and most prestigious award for gallantry in the face of the enemy that can be awarded to British and Commonwealth forces.

Details
Lodge was 33 years old, and a gunner in "Q" Battery, Royal Horse Artillery, British Army during the Second Boer War when the following deed took place for which he was awarded the VC:

On 31 March 1900 at Sanna's Post (aka Korn Spruit), South Africa, "Q" and "U" batteries of the Royal Horse Artillery were ambushed with the loss of most of the baggage column and five guns of the leading battery. When the alarm was given, 'Q' Battery went into action 1150 yards from the spruit, until the order to retire was received, when Major Edmund John Phipps-Hornby (VC) commanding the battery ordered the guns and their limbers to be run back by hand to a safe place. This most exhausting operation was carried out by, among others, Gunner Lodge, Sergeant Charles Parker (VC) and Driver Horace Glassock VC. When at last all but one of the guns and one limber had been moved to safety, the battery was reformed. The citation reads:

Lodge was one of the two gunners or drivers elected as described above.

Further information
He later achieved the rank of bombardier. He is buried at Hendon Park Cemetery in London, England in grave number 21820.

Lieutenant Francis Maxwell also earned the Victoria Cross in this action.

The medal
His Victoria Cross is displayed at the National Army Museum in Chelsea, England.

References

Publications
Monuments to Courage (David Harvey, 1999)
The Register of the Victoria Cross (This England, 1997)
Victoria Crosses of the Anglo-Boer War (Ian Uys, 2000)

External links
 Location of grave and VC medal (N.W. London)
 
Angloboerwar.com

Military personnel from Essex
Burials in England
Second Boer War recipients of the Victoria Cross
British recipients of the Victoria Cross
Royal Horse Artillery soldiers
People from Uttlesford (district)
1866 births
1923 deaths
British Army personnel of the Second Boer War
British Army recipients of the Victoria Cross